The Metropolitan Police Act 1860 was one of the Metropolitan Police Acts, granted royal assent on 28 August 1860.

It consisted of two chapters. The first allowed the Commissioner of Police of the Metropolis to assign members of the Metropolitan Police to work in royal dockyards in England and Wales such as Portsmouth and for the Commissioner to issue additional "orders and regulations" to standard Metropolitan Police rules to cover these dockyard divisions. The second outlined the powers of constables in such divisions, which covered the land, rivers and waters in the whole of the relevant dockyard and within a radius of fifteen miles around it, with all the powers he would usually exercise within the Metropolitan Police District The Act was extended to Scotland in 1914 by the Metropolitan Police (Employment in Scotland) Act 1914.

Metropolitan Police were phased out of dockyards between 1922 and 1934, though the Act itself was only repealed by Schedule 10 Part II of the Police Act 1964, except as it was applied by section 3, chapter 11 of the Special Constables Act 1923.

References

United Kingdom Acts of Parliament 1856
Police legislation in the United Kingdom
Ministry of Defence Police
19th-century history of the Royal Navy
20th-century history of the Royal Navy

Repealed United Kingdom Acts of Parliament